The Chile national under-16 and under-17 basketball team is a national basketball team of Chile, administered by the Federación de Basquetbol de Chile.

It represents the country in international under-16 and under-17 (under age 16 and under age 17) basketball competitions.

The team won the 2017 South American Under-17 Championship for the first time after it beat Argentina in the final 70-60.

It played at the Under-17 South American Basketball Championship.

See also
Chile national basketball team
Chile national under-19 basketball team
Chile women's national under-17 basketball team

References

External links
 Archived records of Chile team participations

under
Men's national under-17 basketball teams